Campagnan is a commune situated in the Hérault Department of Southern France.

Population

See also
Communes of the Hérault department

References

Communes of Hérault